Gilder is a surname. It may refer to:

 Bob Gilder (born 1950), professional golfer
 Eric Gilder (1911–2000), English musicologist
 Gary Gilder (born 1974), South African cricketer 
 George Gilder (born 1939), American writer and political activist
 Jeannette Leonard Gilder (1849–1916), journalist
 Joseph Benson Gilder (1858–1936), journalist
 Nick Gilder (born 1951), Canadian musician
 Richard Gilder (born 1932), American investor, cofounder of Club for Growth
 Richard Watson Gilder (1844–1909), American poet and editor
 Sean Gilder (born 1964), English stage, film and screen actor
 Trey Gilder (born 1985), American professional basketball player 
 Virginia Gilder (born 1958), American rower
 William Henry Gilder (1838–1900), American journalist, soldier, and explorer

See also
 Van Gilder (disambiguation)